James B. Thompson (1843 – August 31, 1875) was an American soldier who fought in the American Civil War. Thompson received his country's highest award for bravery during combat, the Medal of Honor. Thompson's medal was won for capturing the flag of the Confederate's 15th Georgia Infantry at the Battle of Gettysburg on July 3, 1863. He was honored with the award on December 1, 1864.

Thompson was born in Juniata County, Pennsylvania, entered service in Perrysville, and was later buried in Port Royal, Pennsylvania.

Medal of Honor citation

See also
List of Medal of Honor recipients for the Battle of Gettysburg
List of American Civil War Medal of Honor recipients: T–Z

References

1843 births
1875 deaths
American Civil War recipients of the Medal of Honor
People from Juniata County, Pennsylvania
People of Pennsylvania in the American Civil War
Union Army officers
United States Army Medal of Honor recipients
Date of birth unknown